Kundry (minor planet designation: 553 Kundry) is an S-type asteroid belonging to the Flora family in the Main Belt. Its rotation period is 12.605 hours.

Like a number of asteroids discovered by Max Wolf around this time (1904), it is named after a female character in opera, in this case from Richard Wagner's Parsifal.

References

External links 
 
 

000553
Discoveries by Max Wolf
Named minor planets
553 Kundry
000553
19041227